Anna Sergeyevna Silaeva (born 25 May 1992) is a Russian former competitive pair skater. She competed with Artur Minchuk from 2008 to 2011. The pair was named in Russia's team to the 2010 World Junior Championships in The Hague, Netherlands; they finished 11th after placing 9th in the short program and 14th in the free skate. The following season, they qualified for the 2010–11 Junior Grand Prix Final in Beijing, where they finished 8th.

Programs 
(with Minchuk)

Competitive highlights 
JGP: Junior Grand Prix

With Minchuk

Ladies' singles

References

External links 

 

Russian female pair skaters
1992 births
Living people
Figure skaters from Moscow